Beth Peterson (born March 1, 1994) is a Canadian curler from Winnipeg, Manitoba. She currently skips her own team out of the Assiniboine Memorial Curling Club in Winnipeg.

Career
Peterson won the 2015 Manitoba Junior provincial championship skipping her team of Robyn Njegovan, Melissa Gordon and Breanne Yozenko. At the 2015 Canadian Junior Curling Championships, they finished in fifth place with a 6–4 record. The following season, her team began competing on the World Curling Tour and finished runner-up at the 2015 Mother Club Fall Curling Classic. Peterson won her first tour event at the 2016 Atkins Curling Supplies Classic where she defeated Darcy Robertson 7–6 in the final. At the 2017 Manitoba Scotties Tournament of Hearts, Peterson skipped her team to a 4–3 record, not enough to qualify for the playoff round.

Peterson and longtime teammate Melissa Gordon added Jenna Loder and Katherine Doerksen to their team for the 2018–19 season. The team had three semifinal finishes on the tour and won the Manitoba Scotties Berth Bonspiel to qualify for the 2019 Manitoba Scotties Tournament of Hearts. Peterson would have her most successful provincial championship to date, finishing 5–2 through the round robin and qualifying for a tiebreaker against Abby Ackland. Despite tying the game in the seventh end, Team Peterson would give up three points in the eighth end, ultimately losing the game 8–7. The 2019–20 season was a successful season for the Peterson rink as they qualified for the playoffs in eight of their ten events. They also got to play in their first Grand Slam of Curling event at the 2019 Tour Challenge Tier 2 where they lost in the semifinal to South Korea's Kim Min-ji. Despite entering the 2020 Manitoba Scotties Tournament of Hearts as the fourth seed, Team Peterson finished the round robin with a 2–3 record, failing to reach the championship pool round.

Due to the COVID-19 pandemic in Canada, many provinces had to cancel their provincial championships, with member associations selecting their representatives for the 2021 Scotties Tournament of Hearts. Due to this situation, Curling Canada added three Wild Card teams to the national championship, which were chosen according to the CTRS standings from the 2019–20 season. Because Team Peterson ranked 12th on the CTRS and kept at least three of their four players together for the 2020–21 season, they got the third Wild Card spot at the 2021 Scotties in Calgary, Alberta. One member of Peterson's rink, Melissa Gordon opted to not attend the Scotties due to work commitments. She was replaced by Brittany Tran, who competed at the Scotties in 2019 as second for the Northwest Territories. At the Tournament of Hearts, Peterson led her team to a respectable 7–5 fifth place finish.

Personal life
Peterson works as a radiation therapist at CancerCare Manitoba. She is married to David Turnbull, and has one son.

Teams

References

External links

1994 births
Canadian women curlers
Living people
Curlers from Winnipeg